Washington Yotto Ochieng  is a Kenyan academic who is Head of the Department of Civil and Environmental Engineering at Imperial College London. Previously, he was  Head of the Centre for Transport Studies and Co-Director of the Institute for Security Science and Technology(ISST) together with Deeph Chana. Ochieng is a Senior Security Science Fellow in ISST. He also serves as Director of the Engineering Geomatics Group and Chair of Positioning and Navigation Systems.

Early life and education 
He earned his BSc (First Class) in  Engineering from the  University of Nairobi in 1988, before moving to the United Kingdom  where he studied for an MSc (distinction)  at the University of Nottingham. He went on to  a study for  a PhD in  Differential GPS (DGPS) and fiducial network design.

Research and career 
Ochieng remained at Nottingham as a postdoctoral research associate after his PhD, before joining Thales Group as a navigation engineer. Ochieng joined Imperial College London in 1997. He works on the design and application of navigation systems, and hopes to achieve a truly global position, navigation and timing (PNT) system. He has been involved with several international projects, including European Geostationary Navigation Overlay Service (EGNOS), Galileo, global navigation satellite system (GNSS) and the Single European Sky ATM Research (SESAR) joint undertaking. For the GNSS system, Ochieng worked on sensing, modelling of errors in the positional accuracy and ultra-wideband radio systems. He has been involved with the transformation of London's transport system and introduction of the London Congestion Charge.

He was promoted to a Chair in Positioning and Navigation Systems in 2007.
In 2021, he became the Vice President of the Royal Institute of Navigation (RIN). His focussed research is into  the development of tools that help to shape the thinking of societies in the design and building of infrastructure resilience and security; smart user-centric intermodal mobility and; Positioning, Navigation and Timing (PNT) systems.

At Imperial College London,  Ochieng is part of the  Engineering and Physical Sciences Research Council (EPSRC) Centre for Doctoral Training in Sustainable Civil Engineering. He has advised on algorithms that can support the navigation of satellites.

In 2021, Ochieng was an expert witness on UK space strategy and UK satellite infrastructure at the Parliamentary select committee on science and technology.

Awards and honours 
1994 Nottingham, United Kingdom, The Leica Award for the Best Postgraduate Student in Engineering Surveying and Space Geodesy, United States.  Recipient Best Session paper, United States Institute Navigation,	
1994  Best Paper – Airborne Detection of Calibration Errors in DME Navigation Aids, awarded by the Institute of Navigation,
2004 Best Paper – Integrated positioning algorithms for Transport Telematics Applications, Awarded by Institute of Navigation 
2005 Imperial College London,  Rector's Merit Award for Excellence in Research, Teaching, Professional Contribution and Administration
2005 Best Poster Presentations at the 57th Annual Conference of the Aeronautical Society of India, Dr Abdul KAlam award – Best research presentation on aviation target safety outcomes, Awarded by the Aeronautical Society of India 
2005 Baltimore, USA, Best Paper – The factors affecting airspace capacity in Europe: A framework methodology based on cross-sectional time-series analysis Awarded at the 6th USA/Europe Air Traffic Management (ATM) Research & Development Seminar 
2006 Imperial College London,  Excellence in Teaching Award
2007 The Michael Richey Medal for Best Paper in the Journal of Navigation Awarded by The Royal Institute of Navigation, UK
2009 GPS World Magazine global GNSS Leaders to watch    
2019 Harold Spencer Jones Gold Medal, the highest award from the Royal Institute of Navigation.

In 2013, Ochieng was elected a Fellow of the Royal Academy of Engineering (FREng)
He is also a Fellow of the UK Institutions of Civil Engineers, Chartered Institute of Highways and Transportation, RIN and Institution of Civil Engineering Surveyors.

References 

Kenyan academics
British Kenya people
Kenyan civil engineers
Transport engineers
Fellows of the Royal Academy of Engineering
Academics of Imperial College London
University of Nairobi alumni
Alumni of the University of Nottingham
1964 births
Living people